John Francis "Jack" Davies (July 14, 1928 – January 19, 2009) was a Canadian ice hockey player with the Edmonton Mercurys. He won a gold medal at the 1952 Winter Olympics in Oslo, Norway. Davies, along with The Mercurys, were inducted into the Canadian Olympic Hall of Fame in 2002.

External links
bio

1928 births
2009 deaths
Ice hockey players at the 1952 Winter Olympics
Olympic gold medalists for Canada
Olympic ice hockey players of Canada
Olympic medalists in ice hockey
Medalists at the 1952 Winter Olympics
Ice hockey people from Edmonton
Canadian ice hockey defencemen